George Bowdler Buckton (24 May 1818, London – 25 September 1905, Haslemere, Surrey) was an English chemist and  entomologist who specialised in aphids.

Early Life

Buckton was born in London and lived in Hornsey, England. He was the eldest son of George Buckton (1785 - 1847; Proctor to the Prerogative Court of Canterbury) and Eliza Buckton (née Merricks, 1786 - 1842). At the age of five he had an accident which left him partially paralysed for the rest of his long life; this precluded attendance at school so he was privately educated. He became however a scholar of classics and was an accomplished musician and painter. After his father's death he moved to Queen's Road, West London, and In 1848 he  became an assistant to August Wilhelm von Hofmann (1818-1892) at the nearby Royal College of Chemistry in London.[1], [2], [3] In 1867 he married Mary Ann Odling (1831 – 1927), the sister of William Odling with whom he had written his last chemical paper. He designed his house at Haslemere and built an observatory there. His eldest daughter was the poet Alice Buckton and Alfred, Lord Tennyson was a near neighbor.

Research in Chemistry

His first paper, on reactions of cyanogen with platinum ammine complexes, appeared in 1852.[4]  He wrote two papers with Hofmann on reactions of sulfuric acid with amides and nitriles. [5] He also published much work on alkyls of main-group elements, e. g. on the discovery of the anti-knock agent tetra-ethyl lead.[6] His last paper on chemistry, on  trimethyl- and triethylaluminium, appeared in 1865 co-authored with William Odling. [7]   Much of his research on alkylmetal compounds has been reviewed by modern authors.[8], [9] He joined the Chemical Society in 1852 and was elected to the Royal Society in 1857.[2] Buckton wrote scientific papers on chemistry until 1865 when he moved to Haslemere and started to study Hemiptera. He joined the Linnaean Society in 1845 and the Entomological Society in 1883.[1] In the field of entomology, he wrote several works:

Monograph of the British Aphides (four volumes, London, 1876-1883). 
Monograph of the British Cicadae or Tettigidae (two volumes, Macmillan & Co., London, 1890-1891). 
The Natural History of Eristalis tenax or the Drone-Fly (Macmillan & Co., London, 1895). 
A Monograph of the Membracidae, with an article by Edward Bagnall Poulton (1856-1943) (Lovell Reeve & Co., London, 1901-1903).
Personality

Of him, Alfred Lord Tennyson wrote that Buckton had "Truly a devoted, spiritual, knightly nature, with a faith as clear as the height of the pure blue heaven."[1]

References 

1. W. F. Kirby, "George Bowdler Buckton 1818-1905," Proc. Roy. Soc. Ser. B 1907, 51, xlv - xlviii. https://www.jstor.org/stable/80046

2. J. Spiller,  "George Bowdler Buckton". J. Chem. Soc., Trans. 1907, 91:663–665. https://doi.org/10.1039/CT9079100660

3. R. Steele (rev. Y. Foote), "Buckton, George Bowdler (1818 - 1905)", Dictionary of National Biography. https://doi.org/10.1093/ref:odnb/32160

4. G. B. Buckton, “Observations upon the deportment of diplatosamine with cyanogen”, Quart. J. Chem. Soc. Lond., 1852, 4, 26 – 34. https://doi.org/10.1039/QJ8520400026

5. G. B. Buckton and A. W. Hofmann. 1856. Researches on the action of sulphuric acid on the amides and nitriles, together with some remarks upon conjugated sulpho-acids. Phil. Trans. R. Soc., 1856, 9, 453–459. https://doi.org/10.1098/rstl.1856.0021

6. G. B. Buckton, “Further remarks on the organo-metallic radicals, and observations more particularly directed to the isolation of mercuric, plumbic, and stannic ethyl,” Proc. Roy. Soc. London 1859, 9, 309 – 316. https://doi.org/10.1098/rspl.1857.0075

7. G. B. Buckton and W. Odling, “Preliminary note on some aluminium compounds”, Proc. Roy Soc. 1865, 14, 19 – 21. https://doi.org/10.1098/rspl.1865.0006 

8. D. Seyferth, “The Rise and Fall of Tetraethyllead. 1. Discovery and Slow Development in European Universities, 1853-1920”. Organometallics 2003, 22, 2346 – 2357. https://doi.org/10.1021/om030245v

9. J. W. Nicholson, “The Early History of Organotin Chemistry”, J. Chem. Ed. 1989, 66, 621 – 623. https://doi.org/10.1021/ed066p621

English chemists
English entomologists
Fellows of the Royal Society
Fellows of the Linnean Society of London
Fellows of the Chemical Society
Fellows of the Royal Entomological Society
1818 births
1905 deaths